Turkey sent a delegation to compete at the 2008 Summer Paralympics in Beijing. The country represented by sixteen athletes, competing in shooting, archery, powerlifting, table tennis, wheelchair tennis, athletics and judo.

Medalists

Sports

Archery

Men

|-
|align=left|Mustafa Demir
|rowspan=2 align=left|Men's individual recurve W1/W2
|600
|14
|L 90-104
|colspan=5|did not advance
|-
|align=left|Ozgur Ozen
|591
|16
|W 96-87
|W 107-100
|W 103-102
|L 98-112
|L 91-92
|4
|}

Women

|-
|align=left|Gülbin Su
|align=left|Women's individual compound
|650
|3
|colspan=2 
|W 112-102
|L 104-106
|L 109-113
|4
|-
|align=left|Gizem Girismen
|rowspan=2 align=left|Women's individual recurve W1/W2
|590
|4
|Bye
|W 103-85
|W 99-83
|W 95-93
|W 91-85
|
|-
|align=left|Hanife Ozturk
|503
|14
|L 78-82
|colspan=5|did not advance
|}

Athletics

Men's track

Judo

Powerlifting

Men

Women

Shooting

Women

Table tennis

Wheelchair tennis

See also
2008 Summer Paralympics
Turkey at the Paralympics
Turkey at the 2008 Summer Olympics

External links
Beijing 2008 Paralympic Games Official Site
International Paralympic Committee

References

Nations at the 2008 Summer Paralympics
2008
Paralympics